The following lists events that happened during 2002 in Ivory Coast.

Incumbents
President: Laurent Gbagbo
Prime Minister: Pascal Affi N'Guessan

Events

September
 September 19 - An attempted coup by disaffected former soldiers of Côte d'Ivoire was put down, with the death of the alleged coup leader, General Robert Guéï, a former military dictator of the country. Guéï was killed when his car refused to stop at a roadblock in downtown Abidjan. Rebels continue in control of the cities of Bouaké and Korhogo.

References

 
2000s in Ivory Coast
Years of the 21st century in Ivory Coast
Ivory Coast
Ivory Coast